A list of notable flat horse races which take place annually in France, under the authority of France Galop, including all conditions races which currently hold Group 1, 2 or 3 status in the European Pattern.

Group 1

Group 2

Group 3

Other races

Discontinued

References
 tjcis.com – Flat races in France, 2018.

Flat
 Flat horse races
Horse racing-related lists